Clermont was launched at in 1786, or 1787 in South Carolina, or New York. She spent almost her entire career sailing between Britain and North America. In 1798 a French privateer captured her but a British slaver homeward-bound recaptured her. She was last listed around 1808, at which time she had been sailing as a London-based coaster

Career
Clarement first appeared in Lloyd's Register (LR) in 1787.

In November 1798 Lloyd's List reported that the French privateer  had captured several vessels near the Newfoundland Banks. The vessels were Clermont, Commerce, and George, and two other English vessels and one Portuguese. The slave ship  recaptured Clermont as Brooks was returning to England after having delivered her slaves to Jamaica. Clermont, Bartels, master, had been sailing from North Carolina when Brooks recaptured her.

Fate
Clermont was last listed in LR in 1808 with data unchanged since 1805. She was listed in the Register of Shipping for a few more years, also with data unchanged from earlier years. The Register of Shipping showed her trade as "London coaster".

Citations

1780s ships
Ships built in the United States
Age of Sail merchant ships of England
Captured ships